Kannalife Sciences Inc. , a subsidiary of Neuropathix, Inc., is a bio-pharmaceutical and phyto-medical company based in Doylestown, Pennsylvania founded by Dean Petkanas and Thoma Kikis. Kannalife was formed in 2010 and is involved in the research and development of novel new therapeutic agents designed to reduce oxidative stress, and act as immuno-modulators and neuroprotectants.

In 2011, the company was granted an Exclusive License by National Institutes of Health – Office of Technology Transfer (NIH-OTT) for the Commercialization of patent , “Cannabinoids as Antioxidants and Neuroprotectants."

Kannalife is currently conducting research and development at the Pennsylvania Biotechnology Center of Bucks County in Doylestown, PA, for a target drug candidate, KLS-13019 to treat Chemotherapy-induced peripheral neuropathy, Hepatic encephalopathy, Mild Traumatic Brain Injury and CTE, an oxidative stress related disease that affects the cognitive and behavioral functions, and the wellness of the brain.

Kannalife was featured in Sports Illustrated article on using cannabinoids to treat Concussions and CTE.

References

Health care companies established in 2010
Health care companies based in Pennsylvania
Companies based in Bucks County, Pennsylvania
Pharmaceutical companies of the United States
Cannabis research
American companies established in 2010
2010 in cannabis